The international Herbert von Karajan Music Prize was an annual award presented by the Festspielhaus Baden-Baden in honour of the celebrated 20th century Austrian conductor, Herbert von Karajan. The prize was inaugurated in 2002 and the monetary element was set at 50,000 Euro, which must be used by the recipient to help further the careers of young musicians. It was first awarded in 2003, to the German violinist Anne-Sophie Mutter. The prize was funded by the Herbert von Karajan Family Foundation Helibelle.

The prize was last awarded in 2015. The successor award is the Herbert von Karajan Prize in Salzburg.

The Herbert von Karajan Music Prize is not to be confused with the Herbert von Karajan Foundation’s “International Competition for Conductors” launched in Berlin in September 1969, whose winners included Valery Gergiev and Mariss Jansons.

Recipients

 2003: Anne-Sophie Mutter
 2004: Berlin Philharmonic
 2005: Evgeny Kissin
 2006: Valery Gergiev
 2007: John Neumeier
 2008: Alfred Brendel
 2009: Thomas Quasthoff
 2010: Daniel Barenboim
 2011: Helmuth Rilling
 2012: Cecilia Bartoli
 2013: Edita Gruberová
 2014: Vienna Philharmonic
 2015: Thomas Hengelbrock

References

External links
Festspielhaus Baden-Baden: Herbert von Karajan Music Prize Archive

German music awards
Classical music awards
Awards established in 2002
Herbert von Karajan
2002 establishments in Germany